Kartaganovo is a rural locality (a village) in Kupriyanovskoye Rural Settlement, Gorokhovetsky District, Vladimir Oblast, Russia. The population was 5 as of 2010.

Geography 
Kartaganovo is located 15 km southeast of Gorokhovets (the district's administrative centre) by road. Krylovo is the nearest rural locality.

References 

Rural localities in Gorokhovetsky District